Havas Kandi (also Romanized as Ḩavās Kandī; also known as Havās) is a village in Ojarud-e Shomali Rural District, in the Central District of Germi County, Ardabil Province, Iran. At the 2006 census, its population was 185, in 32 families.

References 

Towns and villages in Germi County